Dmitry Dmitriyevich Pletnyov (Russian: Дми́трий Дми́триевич Плетнёв; 1871 or 1872, Moskovsky Bobrik village, Kharkov guberniya — 11 September 1941, Medvedev forest near Oryol) was a Russian doctor, medical scientist and publicist. He defended his dissertation on cardiac arrythmias in 1906. He was a member of the liberal Kadet party. He worked in the Moscow University and since 1929 led the therapeutic clinic of the Moscow oblast clinical institute. 1933–1937 he led the research institute of functional diagnostics and experimental therapy. His patients included Lenin, Nadezhda Krupskaya, Ivan Pavlov and other party and state leaders/figures of the USSR. Pletnyov is one of the founders of Russian cardiology. He often visited Western Europe and worked in the best clinics of Germany, Switzerland and France; he was fluent in many languages.

In June 1937 Pravda published a slanderous article on Pletnyov "Professor-rapist, sadist" after which he was imprisoned in Lubyanka and sentenced to two years in prison on probation by a case fabricated by NKVD. In December 1937, Dmitri Pletnyov was again arrested and in 1938 was a defendant on the process of the Anti-Soviet "Bloc of Rightists and Trotskyites", a show trial arranged by the NKVD. He had been severely tortured – which led to paralysis of half of his body – and deprived of sleep. So he had to "admit" absurd charges such as having caused the death of Maxim Gorky by deliberately choosing "wrong methods of treatment" etc. Even in prison, he remained a scientist:  In his cell he requested many books and monographs in order to continue research. Many of those were in foreign languages. He was sentenced to 25 years in jail and finally extrajudicially executed in 1941.

References

1870s births
1941 deaths
People from Sumy Oblast
People from Kharkov Governorate
Russian Constitutional Democratic Party members
Russian cardiologists
Case of the Anti-Soviet "Bloc of Rightists and Trotskyites"
Great Purge victims from Russia